The Gaulier River is a river of Grenada. This river is in the parish of Saint John.

See also
List of rivers of Grenada

References
Grenada map

Rivers of Grenada